Ubre Blanca (c. 1972–1985) was a cow in Cuba known for her prodigious milk production.  The cow, along with the "Cordón de La Habana" coffee plantations, the Voisin pasture system, and the microjet irrigation system, symbolizes Fidel Castro's efforts to modernize Cuba's agricultural economy.  The Spanish phrase  translates to the English phrase "white udder."

Ubre Blanca produced 113 liters (241 pounds) of milk on a single day in January 1982 – more than four times a typical cow's production. The cow also produced 24,268.9 liters of milk (about 55,090 pounds at 2.27 pounds per liter) in 305 days (one lactation period) ending in February 1982. Both feats were recognized by Guinness World Records as world records. The cow was a cross between a Holstein bull (also known as a dairy cow) and a zebu cow (Indian cow breed that does not produce much milk). In February 2020, Guinness World Records announced the Brazilian cow Marilia surpassed Ubre Blanca's record of milk production in a single day, producing  of milk.

Use in Cuban media
Castro referred to Ubre Blanca's prodigious output in speeches as evidence of communism's superior breeding skills, and the cow's achievements were often printed in Cuban newspapers.  On May 21, 2002, The Wall Street Journal published an article about Cuban attempts to clone Ubre Blanca, in which they reported that Ubre Blanca's sire was actually a Canadian bull. To many Cubans, Ubre Blanca evokes memories of the era before the so-called "Special Period" – the economic collapse that followed the demise of the Soviet Union, Cuba's main benefactor, beginning in 1989.

Death
In 1985, Ubre Blanca was euthanized around the age of 13 (the exact age is unknown). The cow's death was commemorated by Communist Party newspaper Granma with a full obituary and eulogy.  Taxidermists stuffed Ubre Blanca and put the body in a climate-controlled glass case at the entrance to the National Cattle Health Center, a 45-minute drive from old Havana, where it still remains.  Ubre Blanca was honored by her hometown of Nueva Gerona, which erected a marble statue in memory of the cow. Since the cow's death, Cuban scientists have unsuccessfully attempted to clone Ubre Blanca using frozen tissue samples.

Poem
In the poem Ganadería, Cuban exile and poet Ricardo Pau-Llosa retells the story of Ubre Blanca as an allegory of Castro's rise to power.

See also

Agriculture in Cuba
Fidel Castro and dairy

References

External links
https://web.archive.org/web/20050418142437/http://asturiasliberal.org/files/ubre.JPG Picture of Fidel Castro with Ubre Blanca
GM watch article

1972 animal births
1985 animal deaths
Economy of Cuba
Individual cows
Agriculture in Cuba
Individual animals in Cuba